Picolo is the name of a character created by Paul Buissonneau for Canadian Broadcasting Corporation (CBC). Picolo is also the title track of several program series with Paul Buissonneau in the title role aired on television channel CBC. For several years, even in official sources, the spelling Picolo or Piccolo is used.

Original Character
It all began in the summer of 1956, when Fernand Golden Buissonneau asked Paul to write the texts of the Picolo series and personify the title role. In this 13-part series, Picolo spoke with characters from fairy tales (Bluebeard, Little Red Riding Hood, Puss in Boots the Cadet Rousselle, Tom Thumb, Mother Michel, etc.). In this series, we also met Claude Préfontaine and Gilles Gauthier.

The costume was made from a drawing by Francoise Charbonneau.

Thereafter, from the 1956-1957 season, Picolo also became a character in La Boîte à Surprise (The Surprise Box). He addressed the themes of the Commedia dell'arte with Pulcinella, Harlequin, etc.

Also as part of La Boîte à Surprise, another series of 33 episodes that focuses on the areas of France was made.

Paul Buissonneau created a third series, as part of the Surprise Box with Picolo "Picolo and objects". This is a 15-minute program. It was rebroadcast on Wednesday morning 17 and 24 May 1967.

Description from "Here CBC: local listings for television" "Clown strange, half-Pierrot, Harlequin half, Piccolo can talk to objects around and make them talk with Paul Buissonneau. "

Hold the DVD box set! It is Picolo Volume 1, distributed by Imavision in 2007, includes excerpts of songs from "Picolo and objects."

Meanwhile, Paul Buissonneau interpreted his character Picolo at The Treehouse city of Montreal.

As of October 18, 1967, as part of The Box Surprise, we were treated to a series of episodes of a half-hour "Picolo" which could also be presented as the "Picolo and Michel" when Michael the Magician was present. Paul Buissonneau was in the role of Picolo, Michel Pebbles in the role of Michael the Magician, Pants, the Doctor and Captain Columbine.

From 1968 to 1971, Picolo became a series of thirty-minute episodes covering the main themes of the Commedia dell'arte, with Pants, the Doctor, and Captain Columbine. Michael the magician was also be part of the distribution. Episodes of the 1967-1968 period of the Surprise Box were integrated into the Picolo series.

During the same period, a Picolo musical was produced which had musical interludes featuring Picolo. Thereafter, the musical interludes were released individually at different times, between two programs for several years.

All forms of advertising were removed from TV shows for children. This was necessary to fill the gaps left by the missing ads. There was, on disc, entire directories snippets of famous classical music, stripped of all rights. Paul Buissonneau gave free rein to his imagination to sustain his character Piccolo with small adventures accompanied by the music. These interludes have therefore been included in the regular youth programming on the air instead of advertisements. These interludes were actually gathered during three specials. These interludes were shot on film, and unfortunately, they were lost.

In 1980, creation of the Piccolo Theatre (Piccolo's name is spelled with two "C") in the Threepenny Theatre. This time, however, it was Bernard who personified Meney Piccolo. The production was broadcast on Télé-Métropole December 25, 1981.

In November 2010, the City of Montreal inaugurated a mural in honor of Paul Buissonneau at the corner of Ontario Street and Beaudry. The mural of the character Picolo of The Box Surprise was designed by artist Lawrence Gascon. It measures 227 square feet  (about 21 square meters) and is composed of a mosaic of brightly colored ceramics.

See also: Piccolo (disambiguation)

Notes

References

CBC Television original programming
Television characters introduced in 1956
1950s Canadian children's television series